The following is a list of sport's oldest professional athletes.

See also
List of oldest Major League Baseball players
List of oldest National Hockey League players
List of oldest and youngest National Basketball Association players

References

Oldest professional athletes by sport
Professional athletes
Oldest professional athletes